Shivanagi  is a village in the southern state of Karnataka, India. It is located in the Bijapur taluk of Vijayapura district in Karnataka.

Demographics
 India census, Shivanagi had a population of 8068 with 3669 males and 3399 females.

See also
 Bijapur district, Karnataka
 Districts of Karnataka

References

External links
 http://Bijapur.nic.in/

Villages in Bijapur district, Karnataka